Roderick Saddler (September 26, 1965 – August 19, 2018) was an American professional American football defensive lineman who played five seasons for the St. Louis/Phoenix Cardinals and the Cincinnati Bengals. He is a cousin of former NFL player Clark Gaines. 

He died on August 19, 2018 from a reaction to a pacemaker.

References

1965 births
2018 deaths
Players of American football from Atlanta
American football defensive ends
American football defensive tackles
Texas A&M Aggies football players
St. Louis Cardinals (football) players
Phoenix Cardinals players
Cincinnati Bengals players